Ninety-Nine Novels: The Best in English since 1939 — A Personal Choice is an essay by British writer Anthony Burgess, published by Allison & Busby in 1984. It covers a 44-year span between 1939 and 1983. Burgess was a prolific reader, in his early career reviewing more than 350 novels in just over two years for The Yorkshire Post. In the course of his career he wrote more than 30 novels. The list represents his choices; in an interview with Don Swaim, Burgess revealed that the book was originally commissioned by a Nigerian publishing company and written in two weeks.

The List

Podcast
In January 2022, the International Anthony Burgess Foundation began a podcast examining each of Burgess's Ninety-Nine Novels.

Series One 
1. Finnegans Wake by James Joyce (with Enrico Terrinoni)

2. Wise Blood by Flannery O'Connor (with Alison Arant)

3. Giles Goat-Boy by John Barth (with David Morrell)

4. Heartland by Wilson Harris (with Michael Mitchell)

5. Gravity's Rainbow by Thomas Pynchon (with Simon Malpas)

6. The Bell by Iris Murdoch (with Avril Horner)

7. A Bend in the River by V.S. Naipaul (with Will Ghosh)

8. Party Going by Henry Green (with Marius Hentea)

9. Saturday Night and Sunday Morning by Alan Sillitoe (with James Walker)

Series Two 
1. Goldfinger by Ian Fleming (with Kim Sherwood)

2. The Unlimited Dream Company by J.G. Ballard (with David Ian Paddy)

3. Nineteen-Eighty Four by George Orwell (with John Bowen)

4. The Heat of the Day by Elizabeth Bowen (with Jessica Gildersleeve)

5. Pavane by Keith Roberts (with Glyn Morgan)

6. The Girls of Slender Means and The Mandelbaum Gate by Muriel Spark (with Alan Taylor)

7. Bomber by Len Deighton (with Rob Mallows)

8. For Whom the Bell Tolls and The Old Man and the Sea by Ernest Hemingway (with Mary Dearborn)

9. The Spire by William Golding (with Tim Kendall)

10. The Once and Future King by T.H. White (with Elizabeth Elliott)

References

External links
 "Modern Novels; The 99 Best" by Anthony Burgess, New York Times (February 5, 1984), full text of "Introduction"
 Deccan Herald (April 11, 2004): "Big novel, shrinking universe"

Books by Anthony Burgess
Books of literary criticism
1984 non-fiction books
Books about books
English-language books
Lists of novels
Allison and Busby books